Yuriy Tsymbalyuk is a former competitive figure skater for the Soviet Union. He is a three-time World Junior bronze medalist, the 1987 Karl Schäfer Memorial bronze medalist, the 1988 Prize of Moscow News silver medalist, and the 1989 Soviet national bronze medalist. His skating club was DSO Spartak in Odessa.

Competitive highlights

References 

Soviet male single skaters
Ukrainian male single skaters
Living people
World Junior Figure Skating Championships medalists
Sportspeople from Odesa
Year of birth missing (living people)